The 1909 Rock Island Independents season was the team's third year in existence. The season resulted in the team posting a 0–3 record.

Schedule

References

See also
American football

Rock Island Independents seasons
Rock Island
Rock Island